Gradišče pri Štjaku is a small settlement east of Štjak in the Municipality of Sežana in the Littoral region of Slovenia.

Name
The name of the settlement was changed from Gradišče to Gradišče pri Štjaku in 1953.

References

External links

Gradišče pri Štjaku on Geopedia

Populated places in the Municipality of Sežana